Svein Johannes Haagensen (born November 23, 1939) is a Norwegian ice hockey player. He was born in Oslo and represented the club Hasle/Løren IL. He played for the Norwegian national ice hockey team, and  participated at the Winter Olympics in 1968 and 1972.

References

1939 births
Living people
Ice hockey players at the 1968 Winter Olympics
Ice hockey players at the 1972 Winter Olympics
Norwegian ice hockey players
Olympic ice hockey players of Norway
Ice hockey people from Oslo